Jan Seyffarth (born 12 July 1986, in Querfurt, Bezirk Halle) is a German racing driver. He has competed in such series as the FIA GT3 European Championship, Rolex Sports Car Series and Porsche Supercup.

Career results

Complete Porsche Supercup results
(key) (Races in bold indicate pole position) (Races in italics indicate fastest lap)

† — Did not finish the race, but was classified as he completed over 90% of the race distance.

‡ Guest Driver — Ineligible for points

FIA GT Series results

External links
 Official website
 Career statistics from Driver Database
 Speedsports Profile

1986 births
Living people
People from Querfurt
People from Bezirk Halle
German racing drivers
Racing drivers from Saxony-Anhalt
American Le Mans Series drivers
Austrian Formula Three Championship drivers
Porsche Supercup drivers
International GT Open drivers
Blancpain Endurance Series drivers
ADAC GT Masters drivers
24 Hours of Spa drivers

Porsche Motorsports drivers
Abt Sportsline drivers
Rowe Racing drivers
Team Rosberg drivers
Nürburgring 24 Hours drivers
Porsche Carrera Cup Germany drivers